Dominic Carter is an English actor.

Career
Carter has appeared in several British television and film projects, including Going off Big Time, Dockers, The Bill, Dalziel and Pascoe, Doctors, Drop Dead Gorgeous and The Case.

He played the recurring role of DC Hooch in Coronation Street and he portrayed Janos Slynt in four seasons of the HBO TV series Game of Thrones.

Filmography

Film

Television

References

External links 
 

21st-century English male actors
Living people
English male television actors
English male film actors
Year of birth missing (living people)
Place of birth missing (living people)